Rossoshi is a rural locality (a selo) and the administrative center of Rossoshinsky Selsoviet of Altaysky District, Altai Krai, Russia. The population was 1018 as of 2016. There are 17 streets.

Geography 
The village is located on the bank of the Poperechnaya River, 23 km northwest of Altayskoye (the district's administrative centre) by road. Starobelokurikha is the nearest rural locality.

Ethnicity 
The village is inhabited by Russians and others.

References 

Rural localities in Altaysky District, Altai Krai